In quantum field theory, a Ward–Takahashi identity is an identity between correlation functions that follows from the global or gauge symmetries of the theory, and which remains valid after renormalization.

The Ward–Takahashi identity of quantum electrodynamics (QED) was originally used by John Clive Ward and Yasushi Takahashi to relate the wave function renormalization of the electron to its vertex renormalization factor, guaranteeing the cancellation of the ultraviolet divergence to all orders of perturbation theory. Later uses include the extension of the proof of Goldstone's theorem to all orders of perturbation theory.

More generally, a Ward–Takahashi identity is the quantum version of classical current conservation associated to a continuous symmetry by Noether's theorem. Such symmetries in quantum field theory (almost) always give rise to these generalized Ward–Takahashi identities which impose the symmetry on the level of the quantum mechanical amplitudes. This generalized sense should be distinguished when reading literature, such as Michael Peskin and Daniel Schroeder's textbook, from the original Ward–Takahashi identity.

The detailed discussion below concerns QED, an abelian theory to which the Ward–Takahashi identity applies. The equivalent identities for non-abelian theories such as quantum chromodynamics  (QCD) are the Slavnov–Taylor identities.

Ward–Takahashi identity 

The Ward–Takahashi identity applies to correlation functions in momentum space, which do not necessarily have all their external momenta on-shell.  Let

Also define  to be the simpler amplitude that is obtained by removing the photon with momentum k from our original amplitude. Then the Ward–Takahashi identity reads

where e is the charge of the electron and is negative in sign.  Note that if  has its external electrons on-shell, then the amplitudes on the right-hand side of this identity each have one external particle off-shell, and therefore they do not contribute to S-matrix elements.

Ward identity 

The Ward identity is a specialization of the Ward–Takahashi identity to S-matrix elements, which describe physically possible scattering processes and thus have all their external particles on-shell.  Again let  be the amplitude for some QED process involving an external photon with momentum , where  is the polarization vector of the photon.  Then the Ward identity reads:

 

Physically, what this identity means is the longitudinal polarization of the photon which arises in the ξ gauge is unphysical and disappears from the S-matrix.

Examples of its use include constraining the tensor structure of the vacuum polarization and of the electron vertex function in QED.

Derivation in the path integral formulation 

In the path integral formulation, the Ward–Takahashi identities are a reflection of the invariance of the functional measure under a gauge transformation.

If the gauge transformation corresponds to a global symmetry of the theory, then,

for some "current" J (as a functional of the fields ) after integrating by parts and assuming that the surface terms can be neglected.

Then, the Ward–Takahashi identities become

This is the QFT analog of the Noether continuity equation .

If the gauge transformation corresponds to an actual gauge symmetry then

But note that even if there is not a global symmetry (i.e. the symmetry is broken), we still have a Ward–Takahashi identity describing the rate of charge nonconservation.

If the functional measure is not gauge invariant, but happens to satisfy

where  is some functional of the fields , we have an anomalous Ward–Takahashi identity, for example when the fields have a chiral anomaly.

References

Gauge theories
Quantum electrodynamics